Lapoș is a commune in Prahova County, Muntenia, Romania. It is composed of four villages: Glod, Lapoș, Lăpoșel and Pietricica.

The rivers Cricovul Sărat and Nișcov have their source nearby. The county road DJ235 connects Lapoș to the Sângeru commune.

On these lands, Doamna Neaga, the wife of Mihnea Turcitul, Voivode of Wallachia between 1577 and 1583, and again from 1585 to 1591, had their gardens and orchards.

The Lapoș oil field is located on the territory of the commune.

References

Communes in Prahova County
Localities in Muntenia